Hanggin may refer to:

Hanggin Banner, in Ordos, Inner Mongolia, China
Hanggin Rear Banner, in Bayan Nur, Inner Mongolia, China